Bawali Unlimited is a 2012 Bengali comedy film directed by Sujit Mondal and produced by Pankaj Agarwal.

Cast 
 Joy Kumar Mukherjee as Santo/Soniya
 Payel as Munmun
 Sourav Nandy as Pappu
 Sabyasachi Chakrabarty Daman
 Rajatava Dutta as Mohan
 Kanchan Mallick as Fakir
 Sayak Chakraborty
 Dev ( Special appearance as cameo) as Inspector Joy Banerjee
 Parthasarathi as Hagan

Soundtrack
The soundtrack features 6 songs composed by Savvy and Dev Sen

See also 
 Khoka 420

References

External links
 

Indian action comedy films
Indian buddy comedy films
Films scored by Savvy Gupta
Bengali-language Indian films
2010s Bengali-language films
Cross-dressing in Indian films